This is an introduction to some of the books and novels written about Southeast Asia.

General
At war with Asia by Noam Chomsky. Describes the American-Vietnam War, and the bombing campaigns on neighboring countries.
Democracy by Joan Didion. Set in Southeast Asia (and Hawaii) at the end of the Vietnam War.
The Quiet American by Graham Greene
The Ugly American by Eugene Burdick and William Lederer.
 
Lokesh Chandra, & International Academy of Indian Culture. (2000). Society and culture of Southeast Asia: Continuities and changes. New Delhi: International Academy of Indian Culture and Aditya Prakashan. 
R. C. Majumdar, Study of Sanskrit in South-East Asia
R. C. Majumdar, Suvarnadvipa, Ancient Indian Colonies in the Far East, Vol.II, Calcutta,
R. C. Majumdar, India and South-East Asia, I.S.P.Q.S. History and Archaeology Series Vol. 6, 1979, .
R. C. Majumdar, History of the Hindu Colonization and Hindu Culture in South-East Asia; Ancient Indian colonisation in South-East Asia;  Hindu Colonies in the Far East, Calcutta, 1944, 
 
 Panikkar, K. M. (1953). Asia and Western dominance, 1498-1945, by K.M. Panikkar. London: G. Allen and Unwin.

Burma (Myanmar)

Burmese Days by George Orwell. Orwell served as a police officer in the British Empire and this fueled his contempt for colonialism evident in the book
Freedom from Fear by Aung San Suu Kyi
The Heart Must Break by James Mawdsley
The Land of Green Ghosts by Pascal Khoo Thwe

Cambodia

Pol Pot
The Trial of Henry Kissinger by Christopher Hitchens. Hitchens details the bombing campaigns against Cambodia (amongst others).
R. C. Majumdar, Kambuja Desa Or An Ancient Hindu Colony In Cambodia, Madras, 1944

Indonesia

Hidden Agendas by John Pilger
Rogue State by Noam Chomsky. Both of these detail the attacks on East Timor.
Hoadley, M. C. (1991). Sanskritic continuity in Southeast Asia: The ṣaḍātatāyī and aṣṭacora in Javanese law. Delhi: Aditya Prakashan.
Hughes-Freeland, F. (1991). Javanese visual performance and the Indian mystique. Delhi: Aditya Prakashan.

Malaysia

The Long Day Wanes by Anthony Burgess

Philippines

Noli Me Tangere by Jose Rizal. Sparked the independence struggle from Spanish colonialism.
El Filibusterismo by Jose Rizal. Sequel to Noli Me Tangere.

Singapore

Thailand

Vietnam

Heroes by John Pilger
The Quiet American by Graham Greene
The Sorrow of War by Bao Ninh
Understanding Vietnam by Neil L Jamiesson
R. C. Majumdar, Champa, Ancient Indian Colonies in the Far East, Vol.I, Lahore, 1927. 

Southeast Asian culture